Sergio Marcos González (born 3 February 1992) is a Spanish footballer who plays for Racing de Santander as a central midfielder.

Club career
Marcos was born in Sacedón, Province of Guadalajara, Castile-La Mancha, and graduated from Atlético Madrid's youth academy. He made his debut as a senior with the B side in the Segunda División B.

In summer 2012, Marcos moved to another reserve team, Villarreal CF B also of the third division. He was appointed their captain at the start of the 2014–15 season.

Marcos first appeared with the main squad in competitive matches on 15 February 2015, starting in a 2–0 La Liga away loss against Rayo Vallecano. On 9 July, he was loaned to Segunda División club CD Lugo in a season-long deal.

Marcos scored his first professional goal on 8 November 2015, the game's only in a 1–0 away victory over Girona FC. On 21 July of the following year, he was transferred to Real Valladolid also in division two after agreeing to a three-year contract; midway through the 2017–18 campaign, however, he left for fellow league side Cultural y Deportiva Leonesa.

Career statistics

Club

References

External links
Villarreal official profile 

1992 births
Living people
Sportspeople from the Province of Guadalajara
Spanish footballers
Footballers from Castilla–La Mancha
Association football midfielders
La Liga players
Segunda División players
Segunda División B players
Primera Federación players
Atlético Madrid B players
Villarreal CF B players
Villarreal CF players
CD Lugo players
Real Valladolid players
Cultural Leonesa footballers
Racing de Santander players